Brian Thomas Helgeland (born January 17, 1961) is an American screenwriter, film producer and director. He is most known for writing the screenplays for the films L.A. Confidential and Mystic River. He also wrote and directed the films 42, a biopic of Jackie Robinson, and Legend, about the rise and fall of the infamous London gangsters the Kray twins. His work on L.A. Confidential earned him the Academy Award for Best Adapted Screenplay.

Early life
Helgeland was born in Providence, Rhode Island, to Norwegian-born parents Aud-Karin and Thomas Helgeland, and was raised in nearby New Bedford, Massachusetts. He majored in English at University of Massachusetts Dartmouth before following his father's work fishing scallop.

One cold winter day in 1985 made Helgeland consider another job, after finding a book about film schools.

Helgeland eventually settled on a career in film, considering his love for movies. He applied for the film school at Loyola Marymount University in Los Angeles, as it was the only one which could accept him in the middle of the semester.

Career
Helgeland's agent arranged him a meeting with Rhet Topham, who had an idea for a horror comedy film but was having difficulty writing it. The resulting film was 976-EVIL, which the duo managed to sell for $12,000. 976-EVIL marked the directorial debut of Freddy Krueger portrayer Robert Englund, who went on to recommend Helgeland as New Line Cinema wanted to do a new A Nightmare on Elm Street film. Helgeland was paid $70,000 to do what would become A Nightmare on Elm Street 4: The Dream Master. Both films were released in 1988, with The Dream Master hitting theaters earlier. Another script, Highway to Hell, earned Helgeland $275,000 and got a film release in 1992. In 1990, Helgeland and Manny Coto sold a script, The Ticking Man, for $1 million, but the film was never made.

In 1998, Helgeland won both an Academy Award (for Best Adapted Screenplay with L.A. Confidential) and a Razzie (for The Postman) the same year. Only one person had previously achieved the dubious feat (Alan Menken in 1993), and only one other (Sandra Bullock in 2010) has achieved it since. He accepted the Razzie and became only the fourth person in its history to be personally presented with the statuette. He keeps the statues of both the Oscar and the Razzie on his mantle as "a reminder of Hollywood's idealistic nature and unrealistic expectations."

Helgeland wrote and directed the films Payback (1999), A Knight's Tale (2001), The Order (2003), 42 (2013) and Legend (2015). He has worked with director Clint Eastwood twice, in 2002 on Blood Work, and in 2003 on Mystic River, for which he was nominated for an Oscar for Best Adapted Screenplay, and has written an as yet unproduced adaptation of Moby-Dick.

In 2004, Helgeland co-wrote the screenplay for the major motion picture The Bourne Supremacy, for which he was uncredited. In early 2008, he was attached to shape the script of the thriller Green Zone after screenwriter Tom Stoppard had to drop out, again collaborating with director Paul Greengrass, whom he worked with on The Bourne Supremacy, as well as reuniting with actor Matt Damon, who played Jason Bourne/David Webb. Helgeland wrote the screenplay for the remake of The Taking of Pelham 123, replacing screenwriter David Koepp. The film was released on June 12, 2009.

On May 4, 2017, HBO announced that Helgeland is one of four writers working on a potential pilot for a Game of Thrones spin-off. In addition to Helgeland, Carly Wray, Max Borenstein, and Jane Goldman are also working on potential pilots. Helgeland has been working and communicating with George R. R. Martin, the author of A Song of Ice and Fire, the series of novels upon which the original series is based. Former Game of Thrones showrunners D. B. Weiss and David Benioff would also be executive producers for whichever project is picked up by HBO.

Filmography

Additional Awards

References

External links
 
 

1961 births
American male screenwriters
American people of Norwegian descent
Best Adapted Screenplay Academy Award winners
Edgar Award winners
Film directors from Rhode Island
Living people
Loyola Marymount University alumni
Screenwriters from Rhode Island
University of Massachusetts Dartmouth alumni
Writers Guild of America Award winners
Writers from Providence, Rhode Island